Laure Koléla (born 8 March 1991) is a Congolese women's footballer who plays as a defender.

Personal life
Koléla was born in Pointe-Noire, Republic of the Congo. She is the sister of fellow Congoloese women's footballer Chardente Saya Ndoulou. In 2008, Koléla and Saya Ndoulou fled Congo due to the war there, and claimed asylum in France.

Career
She scored in a 2013 Coupe de France Féminine match against St-Léonard, a match which Compiègne won 9–0.

Koléla has played for Congo women's national football team, and has been co-captain alongside Chardente Ndoulou.

References

1991 births
Living people
Republic of the Congo women's international footballers
People from Pointe-Noire
Women's association football defenders
Republic of the Congo women's footballers
Republic of the Congo expatriate sportspeople in France